Synaphea oligantha is a shrub endemic to Western Australia.

The tangled shrub typically grows to  that blooms between July and October producing yellow flowers.

It is found along the south coast on flats and dunes in the Great Southern and Goldfields-Esperance regions of Western Australia where it grows in sandy soils.

References

Eudicots of Western Australia
oligantha
Endemic flora of Western Australia
Plants described in 1995